Cercocarpus, commonly known as mountain mahogany, is a small genus of at least nine species of nitrogen-fixing flowering plants in the rose family, Rosaceae. They are native to the western United States and northern Mexico, where they grow in chaparral and semidesert habitats and climates, often at high altitudes. Several are found in the California chaparral and woodlands ecoregion.

 
The classification of Cercocarpus within the Rosaceae has been unclear. The genus has been placed in the subfamily Rosoideae, but is now placed in subfamily Dryadoideae.

Members of the genus are deciduous shrubs or small trees, typically reaching heights of 3–6 m (9–18 ft) tall, but exceptionally up to 13 m (40 ft) high. C. montanus usually remains under 1 m (3 ft) high because of incessant browsing by elk and deer.

The name is derived from the Greek words κέρκος (kerkos), meaning "tail" and καρπός (karpos), meaning "fruit".  It refers to the tail-like plume on the fruits.

Taxonomy

Species
Cercocarpus comprises the following species:
 Cercocarpus betuloides Nutt. – birch-leaf mountain mahogany
 var. betuloides Nutt.
 var. blancheae (C.K. Schneid.) Little – island mountain mahogany
 var. traskiae (Eastw.) Dunkle – Catalina Island mountain mahogany
 Cercocarpus breviflorus A. Gray – hairy mountain mahogany
 Cercocarpus douglasii Rydb.
 Cercocarpus fothergilloides Kunth
 var. fothergilloides Kunth
 var. mojadensis (C.K. Schneid.) Henrickson
 Cercocarpus intricatus S.Watson
 Cercocarpus ledifolius Nutt. ex Torr. & A.Gray – curl-leaf mountain mahogany
 Cercocarpus macrophyllus C.K.Schneid.
 Cercocarpus mexicanus Henrard
 Cercocarpus mojadensis C.K.Schneid.
 Cercocarpus montanus Raf.
 var. argenteus (Rydb.) F.L.Martin – silver mountain mahogany
 var. glaber (S.Watson) F.L.Martin
 var. macrourus (Rydb.) F.L.Martin
 var. minutiflorus (Abrams) F.L.Martin – smooth mountain mahogany
 var. montanus Raf. – alder-leaf mountain mahogany
 var. paucidentatus (S.Watson) F.L.Martin
 Cercocarpus pringlei (C.K.Schneid.) Rydb.
 Cercocarpus rotundifolius Rydb.
 Cercocarpus rzedowskii Henrard

Species names with uncertain taxonomic status
The status of the following species and hybrids is unresolved:

 Cercocarpus antiquus Lesq.
 Cercocarpus arizonicus M.E.Jones
 Cercocarpus betulaefolius C.K.Schneid.
 Cercocarpus betulaefolius Nutt. ex Hook.
 Cercocarpus breviflorus S.Watson
 Cercocarpus cuneatus Dorf
 Cercocarpus fothergilloides Torr.
 Cercocarpus harneyensis C.A.Arnold
 Cercocarpus macrophyllus C.K.Schneid.
 Cercocarpus miniscalchii (A.Massal.) Principi
 Cercocarpus orestesi Knowlt.
 Cercocarpus pallidus Wooton
 Cercocarpus parviflorus Wooton
 Cercocarpus parvifolius Nutt. ex Hook. & Arn.
 Cercocarpus praefoliolosa R.W.Br.
 Cercocarpus praeledifolius E.W.Berry
 Cercocarpus ravenscragensis E.W.Berry
 Cercocarpus treleasei C.K.Schneid.

References

External links

Jepson Manual Treatment - Cercocarpus

 
Rosaceae genera